Domagoj Antolić (born 30 June 1990) is a Croatian footballer who plays for Damac as a midfielder.

Club career 
Antolić was promoted to the GNK Dinamo Zagreb first team during the spring of 2008. He made his debut in the eternal derby, coming on as a last minute substitute, on 8 March 2008. Antolić made four more appearances that season, all as a substitute.

The next year he went on a season long loan to Dinamo's farm side NK Lokomotiva, who were then in the second division. Antolić had a successful time at Lokomotiva, a consistent starter throughout the season, scoring six goals in a season in which Lokomotiva won promotion.

Antolić returned to Lokomotiva on a six-month loan deal and made 11 appearances for Lokomotiva, now in the first division, before returning to Dinamo in January 2010. At Dinamo, he made 10 appearances until the end of the 09/10 season, helping his side win the title.

Antolić was purchased outright by Lokomotiva in the summer of 2010 on a free transfer due to good relations between Dinamo and Lokomotiva. Antolić sustained a heavy injury early on and therefore made just six appearances that season. The next season, Antolić came back and had one of his best seasons to date, making 25 appearances and scoring four goals. The season after that, the 12/13 season, was even better. Antolić made 29 appearances, scoring seven goals and providing five further assists from central midfield and even captained his side towards the end of the season. It was after this season that Dinamo decided to bring him back, a transfer once again made easier due to the good relations between the two sides.

In the first season of his third spell at Dinamo, Antolić made 39 appearances playing in a range of positions across midfield.

International career 
On 12 November 2014, he made an official senior national team debut for Croatia, starting and playing 90 minutes in a friendly game against Argentina, wearing a jersey numbered 21. He has earned a total of 6 caps scoring no goals. His final international was a January 2017 China Cup match against China.

Career statistics
As of 17 December 2017.

References

External links

 

1990 births
Living people
Footballers from Zagreb
Association football midfielders
Croatian footballers
Croatia international footballers
Croatia youth international footballers
Croatia under-21 international footballers
GNK Dinamo Zagreb players
NK Lokomotiva Zagreb players
Legia Warsaw players
Damac FC players
Croatian Football League players
Ekstraklasa players
Saudi Professional League players
Croatian expatriate footballers
Expatriate footballers in Poland
Croatian expatriate sportspeople in Poland
Expatriate footballers in Saudi Arabia
Croatian expatriate sportspeople in Saudi Arabia